Momodu Munu (born 1938) is a former diplomat from Sierra Leone. From 1985 to 1989, Munu served as the Executive Secretary of the Economic Community of West African States.

References

Munu Momodou
Munu Momodou
Momodu Munu
Munu Momodou